Optical Fiber Technology is a scientific journal that is published by Elsevier (formerly by Academic Press). Established in 1994, it covers various topics in fiber-optic engineering, optical communications and fiber lasers.

See also
 List of periodicals published by Elsevier

External links
Official site
Ingenta listing

Optics journals
Publications established in 1994
Elsevier academic journals